Tang Xiangming (1885–1975), courtesy name Zhuxin (铸新), was a Chinese naval officer. Tang studied Naval warfare in France and the United Kingdom. In 1905, he joined the Chinese United League (Tongmenghui). In 1911, during the Wuchang Uprising, Tang, under the command of Admiral Sa Zhenbing, sailed to Hankou as part of the Qing Navy's assistance to the Qing Army operations in the area. In December 1915, he supported Yuan Shikai's creation of the Empire of China (1915–1916). After Yuan's death, he supported the Zhili clique until their defeat by the Fengtian clique in the Second Zhili–Fengtian War in 1924. In 1930, he supported Shanxi warlord Yan Xishan in opposing Chiang Kai-shek. In 1933, he became a member of the China Democratic Socialist Party. During the Second Sino-Japanese War, he went to Chongqing. After the end of the Chinese Civil War, he stayed on the mainland and died in Beijing at the age of 90. He was the younger brother of Tang Hualong.

References

1885 births
1975 deaths
Chinese Navy officers
People from Huanggang
Writers from Hubei
Republic of China warlords from Hubei
Chinese spiritual writers
Republic of China writers
Qing dynasty Buddhists
Republic of China Buddhists
People of the 1911 Revolution
19th-century Chinese people
20th-century Chinese people
Empire of China (1915–1916)